The 1963 German Grand Prix was a Formula One motor race held at Nürburgring on August 4, 1963. It was race 6 of 10 in both the 1963 World Championship of Drivers and the 1963 International Cup for Formula One Manufacturers. The 15-lap race was won by Ferrari driver John Surtees after he started from second position. Jim Clark finished second for the Lotus team and BRM driver Richie Ginther came in third.

Race report  
Jim Clark led away from pole in his customary fashion. Behind him Lorenzo Bandini spun in front of Innes Ireland who collected him, Willy Mairesse had an accident, and Chris Amon sustained a knee injury when the steering broke, catapulting him into the trees. Graham Hill retired leaving Clark to battle away with John Surtees and Trevor Taylor before engine problems befell Taylor. When Clark's engine went down to just 7 cylinders, Surtees was able to pass him easily to lead him home to take his first F1 victory. Richie Ginther completed the podium. Gerhard Mitter finished in a superb fourth place in his home race from Jim Hall and Jo Bonnier.

This race was notable for being the only time Jim Clark ever finished second in a World Championship race, as well the only race of the season won by a non-British team.

Classification

Qualifying

Race

Championship standings after the race

Drivers' Championship standings

Constructors' Championship standings

 Notes: Only the top five positions are included for both sets of standings.

References

German Grand Prix
German Grand Prix
German Grand Prix